Valettia is a genus of crustaceans belonging to the monotypic family Valettidae.

The species of this genus are found in Europe.

Species:

Valettia coheres 
Valettia hystrix

References

Amphipoda